Geasa are a Celtic metal band originating from Dublin, Ireland. Formed by Fergal Purcell and John Kavanagh in 1993 the band combines traditional Celtic music with black metal to form Celtic black metal. They have released one demo album, one EP, and three albums.
They came onto the scene in 1994 with the Starside demo. The demo was widely traded in the underground and attributed to the band's later record deal. The demo itself comprises two distinct sounds; from the epic black metal sounding "Empyrean" and "Warrior" penned by Purcell to the more Celtic sounding "Starside" and "Rite of passage" written mainly by Kavanagh. This black metal sound was lost when Purcell quit the band in 1996, resulting in the band's major and sometimes-lamented change in sound style post Starside.

Etymology
A  can be compared with a curse or, paradoxically, a gift. If someone under a  violates the associated taboo, the infractor will suffer dishonor or even death. On the other hand, the observing of one's  is believed to bring power. Often it is women who place  upon men. In some cases, the woman turns out to be a goddess or other sovereignty figure.

Discography

Studio albums
 Angel's Cry (1999)
 Fate's Lost Son (2003)
 Godslaughter (2005)

Demo albums
 Starside (1996)

Extended plays
 Murder (2004)

References

External links
 Official Myspace

Celtic metal musical groups
Irish black metal musical groups
Musical groups established in 1994
Musical quartets
Irish folk metal musical groups
Season of Mist artists
1994 establishments in Ireland